Thomas Allen Barndt (born March 14, 1972) is a former professional American football player who played defensive tackle for six seasons for the Kansas City Chiefs, the Cincinnati Bengals, and the New York Jets.

1972 births
Living people
People from Mentor, Ohio
Players of American football from Ohio
American football defensive tackles
American football offensive guards
American football centers
Pittsburgh Panthers football players
Kansas City Chiefs players
Cincinnati Bengals players
New York Jets players
Mentor High School alumni